Amy Laura Wax (born January 19, 1953) is an American lawyer, neurologist, and academic.  She is the Robert Mundheim Professor of Law at the University of Pennsylvania Law School. Her work addresses issues in social welfare law and policy, as well as the relationship of the family, the workplace, and labor markets. She has often made remarks about non-white people that have been described as white supremacist and racist.

Early life 
Wax was born and raised with her two sisters in a Jewish household in Troy, New York, where she attended public schools. Her father worked in the garment industry, and her mother was a teacher and a government administrator in Albany, New York.

Education 
Wax attended and graduated from Yale University (B.S. in molecular biophysics and biochemistry, summa cum laude, 1975). She then attended Somerville College, Oxford (Marshall Scholar in Physiology and Psychology, 1976).

She next attended both Harvard Medical School (M.D. 1981) and Harvard Law School (first year of law school, 1981). Wax practiced medicine from 1982 to 1987, doing a residency in neurology at New York Hospital-Cornell Medical Center and working as a consulting neurologist at a clinic in the Bronx and for a medical group in Brooklyn. She completed her legal education at Columbia Law School (J.D. 1987; Editor of the Columbia Law Review), working part-time to put herself through law school.

Following graduation, Wax clerked for Judge Abner J. Mikva of the  U.S. Court of Appeals for the District of Columbia Circuit from 1987 to 1988. She was admitted to the New York State bar in 1988.

Legal career 
Wax first worked in the Office of the Solicitor General of the United States of the United States Department of Justice from 1988 to 1994. During her tenure in the Office, she argued 15 cases before the United States Supreme Court. She taught at University of Virginia Law School from 1994 to 2000.

Wax is the Robert Mundheim Professor of Law at the University of Pennsylvania Law School, having joined the law school's faculty in 2001.  She received both the A. Leo Levin Award for Excellence in an Introductory Course, and the Harvey Levin Memorial Award for Teaching Excellence. In 2015, she received a Lindback Award for Distinguished Teaching, making her one of three Penn Law professors to have received the award in 20 years.

Her academic focus is on social welfare law and policy, and the relationship of the family, the workplace, and labor markets.  Wax authored Race, Wrongs, and Remedies: Group Justice in the 21st Century (2009).

Controversial statements

Statements about race and culture 
In an August 2017 piece in The Philadelphia Inquirer titled "Paying the price for breakdown of the country's bourgeois culture", she wrote with San Diego law professor Larry Alexander that since the 1950s, the decline of "bourgeois values" (such as hard work, self-discipline, marriage, and respect for authority)  had contributed to social ills such as male labor force participation rates down to Great Depression-era levels, endemic opioid abuse, half of all children being born to single mothers, and many college students lacking basic skills. The authors asserted that "all cultures are not equal. Or at least they are not equal in preparing people to be productive in an advanced economy." She told The Daily Pennsylvanian that "everyone wants to go to countries ruled by white Europeans" because of their "superior" mores. 
In the same interview, Wax strongly emphasized that she did not believe in the superiority of one race over another, but was describing the situation in various countries and cultures.

In a September 2017 podcast interview with Professor Glenn Loury, Wax said: "Take Penn Law School, or some top 10 law school... Here's a very inconvenient fact . . . I don't think I've ever seen a black student graduate in the top quarter of the class, and rarely, rarely in the top half ... I can think of one or two students who scored in the top half in my required first-year course," and said that Penn Law has a racial diversity mandate for its law review. University of Pennsylvania Law School Dean Theodore Ruger responded, "Black students have graduated in the top of the class at Penn Law, and the Law Review does not have a diversity mandate. Rather, its editors are selected based on a competitive process."

In July 2019, at the Edmund Burke Foundation's inaugural National Conservatism conference, Wax said, "Embracing . . . cultural distance nationalism, means in effect taking the position that our country will be better off with more whites and fewer non-whites."

Reactions
An August 2017 petition seeking to fire Wax gathered about 4,000 signatures. That same month, 33 of her fellow Penn Law faculty members signed an open letter condemning statements Wax made in her Philadelphia Inquirer piece and Daily Pennsylvanian interview. The Penn Law chapter of the National Lawyers Guild condemned her comments. Graduate Employees Together – University of Pennsylvania, a group of unionizing graduate students, said: "We are outraged that a representative of our community upholds, and published, these hateful and regressive views." Asa Khalif, a leader of Black Lives Matter Pennsylvania, demanded that Wax be fired. Khalif said that he had notified the university that, if Wax were not fired within a week, he would begin disrupting university classes and other activities with a series of protests.

As a result of these controversies, in March 2018, Dean Ruger stripped Wax of her duties teaching curriculum courses to first-year students. He condemned her comments as "repugnant," and, at a student town hall meeting, he said that "her presence here ... makes me angry, it makes me pissed off... she still works here ... sucks," but that "the only way to get rid of a tenured professor is this process... that's gonna take months."

In a March 2018 opinion piece in The Wall Street Journal titled "The University of Denial; Aggressive suppression of the truth is a central feature of American higher education," Wax wrote: The mindset that values openness understands that the truth can be inconvenient and uncomfortable.... Hoarding and hiding information relevant to such differences... violates basic principles of fair play... Universities, like other institutions, scheme relentlessly to keep such facts from view.

Conservative political analyst Mona Charen said that the op-ed on bourgeois values "contained not a particle of racism" and that "if the Left cannot distinguish reasoned academic arguments from vile racist insinuations, it will strengthen the very extremists it fears." In a Wall Street Journal op-ed, political commentator Heather Mac Donald criticized the "hysterical response" to Wax's piece. University of Pennsylvania Law School Overseer Paul Levy resigned to protest what he termed Wax's "shameful treatment". Levy wrote in his letter of resignation: "Preventing Wax from teaching first-year students doesn't right academic or social wrongs. Rather, you are suppressing what is crucial to the liberal educational project: open, robust and critical debate over differing views of important social issues."

The New Criterion wrote: "Dean Ruger may wish to consult a study published in the Stanford Law Review in 2004 which showed that in the most elite law schools ... only 8 percent of first-year black students were in the top half of their class." Robert VerBruggen, deputy managing editor of the National Review, cited papers he said supported Wax's claims and wrote, "If Penn Law is different, or if things have changed in recent years, let's see some numbers."

Jonathan Zimmerman, who teaches education and history at Penn, wrote: "I think a lot of what Amy Wax says is wrong. But ... I also think it's my duty to defend her right to say it, and to plead for a more honest and fair debate about it... we should want everyone to hear what she says, so that they can come to their own educated conclusions."

Racial remarks 
In 2021, Wax wrote that "As long as most Asians support Democrats and help to advance their positions, I think the United States is better off with fewer Asians and less Asian immigration." claiming Asians are ungrateful for the advantages of living in the US and vote disproportionately for the "pernicious" Democratic Party, which she called "mystifying" because the Democratic Party "demands equal outcomes despite clear . . . group differences" and "valorizes blacks." She favorably cited Enoch Powell while calling for stricter race-based immigration restrictions against Asians.

In April 2022, Wax said on Tucker Carlson Today that "blacks" and other "non-western" groups harbor "resentment, shame, and envy" against western people for their "outsized achievements and contributions." Wax then attacked Indian immigrants for criticizing things in the United States when "their country is a shithole" and went on to say that "the role of envy and shame in the way that the Third World regards the First World [...] creates ingratitude of the most monstrous kind."

Reactions 
Penn Law School's dean, Theodore Ruger, called Wax's statements about Asians "racist", "white supremacist", and "diametrically opposed to the policies and ethos of this institution". Glenn Loury, the Brown professor who had hosted the interview, called her comments "outrageous" and said, "What she said about the Asians could have been said, and was said, about the Jews not so long ago. Today we call that antisemitism." As of January 5, 2022, nearly 9,000 law students had signed a petition to have Wax suspended. The statements drew condemnation from both local Pennsylvania papers and national press.

Wax's comments drew heavy criticism by the Indian-American community, including Penn Law faculty Neil Makhija and U.S. Congressman Raja Krishnamoorthi, who called these comments irresponsible and said, "Such comments create hatred and fear, and cause real harm to minority communities."

References

External links 
"Articles by Amy L. Wax," Penn Law: Legal Scholarship Repository.

1953 births
Living people
Alumni of Somerville College, Oxford
American legal scholars
American neurologists
Women neurologists
American people of Eastern European descent
American women lawyers
Harvard Medical School alumni
Columbia Law School alumni
Family law scholars
Harvard Law School alumni
Jewish American academics
Jewish American attorneys
Lawyers who have represented the United States government
Marshall Scholars
New York (state) lawyers
People from Troy, New York
Physicians from New York (state)
Scholars of civil procedure law
University of Pennsylvania Law School faculty
University of Virginia School of Law faculty
Yale College alumni
NewYork–Presbyterian Hospital physicians
American women academics
21st-century American Jews
21st-century American women